Renato Verissimo de Oliveira (born August 3, 1973) is a Brazilian 5th degree Black belt in Brazilian Jiu jitsu under André Pederneiras and also a retired mixed martial artist, who has fought in the Ultimate Fighting Championship and Elite Xtreme Combat. He is known throughout the MMA community by the nickname of "Charuto", meaning "cigar" in Portuguese.

Life
He grew up in Brazil, where he trained in Brazilian Jiu Jitsu and earned his black belt.  After moving to Hawaii, he became involved in mixed martial arts through BJ Penn, who he instructed.

After fighting in Rumble on the Rock, his UFC debut was a decision victory over Carlos Newton at UFC 46, which earned him the chance to face former UFC Welterweight Champion Matt Hughes at UFC 48, where Charuto lost by unanimous decision.

Charuto then returned to Hawaiian events, fighting for Rumble On The Rock and ICON Sport.

Charuto was featured in the August 8, 2007 episode of the Versus reality television series TapouT.  In his last ever MMA fight, he lost to Jake Shields via TKO due to elbows in the first round on the September 15th card EliteXC: Uprising.

Charuto was also featured in Marshal D. Carper's 2010 book titled "The Cauliflower Chronicles", detailing Marshal's experience training at the BJ Penn Academy in Hilo, largely training under Charuto.

Charuto now resides in Wilmington, NC and teaches at Evolution Mixed Martial Arts in Wrightsville Beach.

Mixed martial arts record

|-
| Loss
|align=center| 7–5 (1)
| Jake Shields
| TKO (elbows and punches)
| EliteXC: Uprising
| 
|align=center| 1
|align=center| 4:00
| Honolulu, Hawaii, United States
|
|-
|Win 
|align=center| 7–4 (1)
| Lars Haven
| TKO (punches) 
| Icon Sport: Epic
| 
|align=center| 1
|align=center| 2:09
| Honolulu, Hawaii, United States
|
|-
| Win
|align=center| 6–4 (1)
| Kris Fleurstil
| TKO (punches)
| Icon Sport: All in
| 
|align=center| 1
|align=center| 2:19
| Honolulu, Hawaii, United States
|
|-
| Loss
|align=center| 5–4 (1)
| Kuniyoshi Hironaka
| TKO (punches)
| Rumble on the Rock 9
| 
|align=center| 2
|align=center| 3:03
| Honolulu, Hawaii, United States
|
|-
| Loss
|align=center| 5–3 (1)
| Carlos Condit
| KO (knee and punches)
| Rumble on the Rock 8
| 
|align=center| 1
|align=center| 0:17
| Honolulu, Hawaii, United States 
|
|-
| Win
|align=center| 5–2 (1)
| Yuichi Nakanishi
|TKO (Doctor Stoppage)
|Rumble on the Rock 7
| 
|align=center| 2
|align=center| 2:32
| Honolulu, Hawaii, United States
|
|-
| Loss
|align=center| 4–2 (1)
| Frank Trigg
| TKO (elbows)
| UFC 50
| 
|align=center| 2
|align=center| 2:11
| Atlantic City, New Jersey, United States
| 
|-
| Loss
|align=center| 4–1 (1)
| Matt Hughes
| Decision (unanimous)
| UFC 48
| 
|align=center| 3
|align=center| 5:00
| Las Vegas, Nevada, United States
| 
|-
| Win
|align=center| 4–0 (1)
| Carlos Newton
| Decision (unanimous)
| UFC 46
| 
|align=center| 3
|align=center| 5:00
| Las Vegas, Nevada, United States
| 
|-
| Win
|align=center| 3–0 (1)
| Gil Castillo
| TKO (corner stoppage)
| Rumble on the Rock 4
| 
|align=center| 2
|align=center| 5:00
| Honolulu, Hawaii, United States
| 
|-
| Win
|align=center| 2–0 (1)
| Ray Elbe
| TKO (punches)
| Rumble on the Rock 3 
| 
|align=center| 1
|align=center| 1:41
| Hilo, Hawaii, United States
| 
|-
| NC
|align=center| 1–0 (1)
| Shannon Ritch
| No Contest (illegal headbutt)
| Rumble on the Rock 2 
| 
|align=center| 1
|align=center| 3:09
| Hilo, Hawaii, United States
| Ritch cut Verissimo above the left eye with an inadvertent headbutt 
|-
| Win
|align=center| 1–0
| Roland Fabre
| TKO (punches)
| Warriors Quest 4: Genesis 
| 
|align=center| 1
|align=center| 3:50
| Honolulu, Hawaii, United States
|

See also 
List of male mixed martial artists

References

External links 
 
 

Brazilian male mixed martial artists
Brazilian practitioners of Brazilian jiu-jitsu
People awarded a black belt in Brazilian jiu-jitsu
Ultimate Fighting Championship male fighters
Welterweight mixed martial artists
Mixed martial artists utilizing Brazilian jiu-jitsu
Sportspeople from Rio de Janeiro (city)
Brazilian expatriate sportspeople in the United States
Living people
1973 births